Ivo Faenzi (born 19 April 1932) is an Italian politician who served as a Deputy for three legislatures from 1972 to 1983.

References

1932 births
Politicians from Grosseto
Italian Communist Party politicians
Deputies of Legislature VI of Italy
Deputies of Legislature VII of Italy
Deputies of Legislature VIII of Italy
Living people